Stefan Nigro (born 10 August 1996) is an Australian professional footballer who plays as a full back  for Melbourne Victory in the A-League.

Club career
Stefan joined the youth squad at Melbourne Victory - the club he was a longtime supporter of - ahead of their successful 2015 National Premier Leagues Victoria 2 season. In the following 2015-16 A-League season he started in 3 senior matches for Victory, receiving wide praise for his Man of the Match performance against Brisbane Roar in his 2016 debut, which included a nutmeg on Thomas Broich.

In June 2016 Victory announced that he had signed a two-year senior contract with the club.

On 15 May 2018, Nigro was released by Melbourne Victory along with three of his teammates.

On 19 July 2018, Brisbane Roar announced Nigro had signed for the club He made his debut as a late substitute in a 2-0 win against Melbourne City FC.

At the end of the 2018/19 season, Nigro was released by Brisbane Roar.

Nigro returned to the A-League in December 2020, signing with Central Coast Mariners.

Personal life
Nigro currently studies a Bachelor of Property and Real Estate at Deakin University.

Honours

Club
Melbourne Victory
 A-League Championship: 2017–18
 FFA Cup: 2021

References

External links

Living people
1996 births
Association football midfielders
Australian soccer players
Ballarat City FC players
Port Melbourne SC players
Melbourne Victory FC players
Brisbane Roar FC players
Green Gully SC players
Central Coast Mariners FC players
National Premier Leagues players
A-League Men players
Australian people of Italian descent